Peter Burian (born 21 March 1959) is a Slovak diplomat and the Ambassador at large for human rights.

Born in Hlohovec, Slovakia, Peter Burian graduated in Oriental Studies at St. Petersburg University in the USSR and entered the service of the Czechoslovak foreign ministry in 1983. Following the breakup of Czechoslovakia on 1 January 1993, he was appointed chargé d'affaires at the newly independent Slovakia's embassy in Washington, D.C. and, shortly after, deputy chief of mission. In 1999, he became the Slovak Ambassador to NATO, based in Brussels, Belgium. He was also Slovakia's permanent representative to the UN from 22 December 2004 to November 2008 and sat on the Security Council when Slovakia was a Member (being the Security Council President for the month of February 2007). He became the Slovak Ambassador to the US in December 2008. He also served as the State Secretary at the Slovak Ministry of Foreign Affairs.

References

External links

 Official website of the Embassy of Slovakia to the United States

Ambassadors of Slovakia to the United States
Permanent Representatives of Slovakia to NATO
Slovak diplomats
Permanent Representatives of Slovakia to the United Nations
People from Hlohovec
Living people
1959 births
Saint Petersburg State University alumni